The Secuș is a left tributary of the river Gurghiu in Transylvania, Romania. It discharges into the Gurghiu in Lăpușna.

References

Rivers of Romania
Rivers of Mureș County